Monastier di Treviso is a comune (municipality) in the Province of Treviso in the Italian region Veneto, located about  northeast of Venice and about  east of Treviso.

Monastier di Treviso borders the following municipalities: Fossalta di Piave, Meolo, Roncade, San Biagio di Callalta, Zenson di Piave.

Demographic evolution

References

Cities and towns in Veneto